V915 Scorpii (HR 6392, HD 155603) is an orange hypergiant variable star in the constellation Scorpius.

Surroundings

V915 Scorpii is surrounded by the sparse OB association Moffat 2.  It is also surrounded by an envelope of dust and gas, producing a significant infrared excess.

V915 Sco has been classified as a triple star.  15" away is the Wolf-Rayet star WR 85, one of the most luminous stars known, but still visually four magnitudes fainter than V915 Sco. Component C is a 10th magnitude K class star 17" away. There is also a 14th magnitude star 22" away. Photometry and space motions suggest that only V915 Sco and WR 85 lie at the same distance, while the other two stars are foreground objects.

Four arc minutes distant are two other assumed members of the association, a 10th magnitude B0 giant and an 11th magnitude OB star. Fitting the association members to a main sequence gives a highly uncertain distance of 1.8 kpc. A kinematical distance has been calculated for the bubble around WR 85 at 2.8 kpc.

Variable

V915 Scorpii is variable over nearly half a magnitude, but the nature of the variations is not known.  Any period associated with the variation is longer than 600 days.

Properties
The distance to V915 Sco is highly uncertain, and it has hardly been observed in the last 20 years, but its absolute magnitude is consistently determined between −8 and −9, making it an extremely luminous supergiant.

The spectral type of V915 Scorpii was determined to be G5Ia in 1954, G5Ia-0 in 1973, G8Ia in 1977, K0Ia in 1982, and K0Ia-0 in 1989, all indicative of a luminous supergiant or hypergiant.

See also
 List of largest stars

References

K-type hypergiants
Scorpii, V915
Scorpius (constellation)
155603
CD-39 11212
084332
Semiregular variable stars
6392
Binary stars
J17142765-3945599
IRAS catalogue objects